The 1986 Minnesota Golden Gophers football team represented the University of Minnesota in the 1986 NCAA Division I-A football season. In their first full year under head coach John Gutekunst, the Golden Gophers compiled a 6–6 record and were outscored by their opponents by a combined total of 316 to 261. The team went to a second straight bowl game for the second time in school history (the first being the 1961 and 1962 Rose Bowls).

Freshman tailback Darrell Thompson was named the Big Ten's freshman of the year. Thompson and kicker Chip Lohmiller were named All-Big Ten first team. Center Ray Hitchcock, Safety Larry Joyner and offensive linemen Jim Hobbins and Troy Wolkow were named All-Big Ten second team. Offensive lineman Paul Anderson, punter Brent Herbel and offensive lineman Jim Hobbins were named Academic All-Big Ten.

Darrell Thompson was awarded the Bronko Nagurski Award and Bruce Smith Award. Linebacker Mark Dusbabek was awarded the Carl Eller Award. Chip Lohmiller was awarded the Bobby Bell Award. Offensive tackle Anthony Burke was awarded the Butch Nash Award. Offensive tackle Norries Wilson was awarded the Paul Giel Award.

Total attendance for the season was 335,150, which averaged out to 55,858 per game. The season high for attendance was against rival Iowa.

Schedule

Personnel

Game summaries

at Oklahoma

at Ohio State

at Wisconsin

    
    
    
    
    
    
    
    
    

MINN: Thompson 26 Rush, 117 Yds

at Michigan

Iowa

vs. Tennessee (Liberty Bowl)

References

Minnesota
Minnesota Golden Gophers football seasons
Minnesota Golden Gophers football